Lead To Light is the second full-length album by American indie rock band Nico Vega.  It was released on July 22, 2014 on iTunes. The album was produced by Dan Reynolds (Imagine Dragons), Tony Hoffer (Beck, Foster The People, M83), and Tim Edgar (Nico Vega).

Media use
Track "I Believe (Get Over Yourself)" was performed live on VH1's Big Morning Buzz Live (episode 47) and Guitar Center Sessions (episode 81).  The track was also featured in the trailer for HBO's Girls (TV series) season 4.

Nico Vega's cover version of "Bang Bang (My Baby Shot Me Down)" was the promotional single for the A&E, History Channel, and Lifetime miniseries Bonnie and Clyde: Dead and Alive (2013).  It also featured on Britain's Got Talent (2014).

"Fury Oh Fury" featured in the launch trailer for popular video game BioShock Infinite (2013), in the 2014 American horror film The Devil's Hand (2014 film) and in the MTV comedy Awkward. (season 3, episode 16).

Track listing

Personnel
Nico Vega
Aja Volkman – vocals
Rich Koehler – guitar
Dan Epand – drums

Charts

References

2014 albums
Albums recorded at Sonic Ranch